Hagerstown City Park is a public urban park just southwest of the central business district of Hagerstown, Maryland, United States. The park is located at the junction of Virginia Avenue, Key Street, Walnut Street, Prospect Street, and Memorial Boulevard.

History
In 1916, under pressure from the public, the City of Hagerstown purchased land to be used for the City Park. The Maryland State General Assembly passed a bill creating a five-member Park Commission in 1918. Three years later, a swamp in the park was drained creating Lower Lake. And in 1924, Mr. and Mrs. Singer donated the Washington County Museum of Fine Arts to City Park.

City Park has been called "America's Second Most Beautiful City Park" and has been designated as a local Preservation Design District since 1989. It was listed on the National Register of Historic Places in 1990.  The district also includes the surrounding industrial area and residential neighborhoods. It consists largely of a late 19th and early 20th century residential area with most houses dating from 1890-1930.

Attractions
There are numerous walking paths and playgrounds in the park as well as athletic facilities such as lighted tennis courts and a baseball field. An outdoor concert stage which holds city events is located in the center of City Park. Also within the park is Park Plaza, a luxury condominium complex. Also available in the park are walking trails, paddle boats, and even fitness events.

Additionally, many of Hagerstown's most visited museums can be found within City Park:
 Washington County Museum of Fine Arts
 Mansion House Art Gallery
 Western Maryland 202 Locomotive Display and Museum
 Hager House and Museum, once home to Jonathan Hager, founder of Hagerstown.

Gallery

References

External links
City Park History
Washington County Museum of Fine Arts
Jonathan Hager House
Western Maryland Ry. 202
, including photo from 1989, at Maryland Historical Trust
Boundary Map of the Hagerstown City Park Historic District, Washington County, at Maryland Historical Trust

Parks in Washington County, Maryland
Hagerstown, Maryland
Parks on the National Register of Historic Places in Maryland
Historic districts on the National Register of Historic Places in Maryland
National Register of Historic Places in Washington County, Maryland
Protected areas established in 1916
1916 establishments in Maryland